Odelouca Dam is a dam in the Odelouca River, in the region of Algarve, in Portugal. Work began in 2002 on a project to dam the river north of its confluence with the Monchique River. The dam was built as to provide public water supplies for the surrounding municipalities. The dam was built in an important area of Algarve ecological and environmental importance and was opposed by the European Economic Community. The overwhelming need for water in the summer by the local population urged its construction despite the opposition. As part of agreements to allow construction, conservation and environmental programmes were implemented to try to lessen the environmental impact of the Dam. The dam was inaugurated and commissioned for service in June 2012. The lake holds  of water.

References

External links
Official website

Dams in Portugal
Buildings and structures in the Algarve
Reservoirs in Portugal